Balcanodiscus is a genus of gastropods belonging to the family Zonitidae.

The species of this genus are found in Greece.

Species:

Balcanodiscus beroni 
Balcanodiscus carinatus 
Balcanodiscus cerberus 
Balcanodiscus danyii 
Balcanodiscus difficilis 
Balcanodiscus frivaldskyanus 
Balcanodiscus magnus 
Balcanodiscus mirus 
Balcanodiscus stummerorum

References

Zonitidae